North Westport is a census-designated place (CDP) in the town of Westport in Bristol County, Massachusetts, United States. The population was 4,571 at the 2010 census.

Geography
North Westport is located at  (41.660495, -71.088407).

According to the United States Census Bureau, the CDP has a total area of 15.9 km (6.2 mi). 13.4 km (5.2 mi) of it is land and 2.5 km (1.0 mi) of it (15.61%) is water.

Demographics

As of the census of 2000, there were 4,533 people, 1,742 households, and 1,299 families residing in the CDP. The population density was 337.2/km (873.9/mi). There were 1,806 housing units at an average density of 134.4/km (348.2/mi). The racial makeup of the CDP was 97.66% White, 0.24% African American, 0.09% Native American, 0.64% Asian, 0.02% Pacific Islander, 0.40% from other races, and 0.95% from two or more races. Hispanic or Latino of any race were 0.75% of the population.

There were 1,742 households, out of which 27.7% had children under the age of 18 living with them, 59.2% were married couples living together, 10.6% had a female householder with no husband present, and 25.4% were non-families. 21.2% of all households were made up of individuals, and 10.2% had someone living alone who was 65 years of age or older. The average household size was 2.60 and the average family size was 3.01.

In the CDP, the population was spread out, with 21.0% under the age of 18, 7.2% from 18 to 24, 28.4% from 25 to 44, 27.9% from 45 to 64, and 15.6% who were 65 years of age or older. The median age was 41 years. For every 100 females, there were 94.8 males. For every 100 females age 18 and over, there were 93.9 males.

The median income for a household in the CDP was $45,433, and the median income for a family was $55,881. Males had a median income of $40,532 versus $30,125 for females. The per capita income for the CDP was $20,790. About 3.4% of families and 6.7% of the population were below the poverty line, including 8.5% of those under age 18 and 9.0% of those age 65 or over.

History
The village of North Westport, is the oldest village out of seven villages located in the town of Westport, Massachusetts.  The village of North Westport and Westport Factory were the headquarters of the Westport Manufacturing Company which was established in 1854 on the banks of the east branch of the Westport River.  The village had many schools, churches, offices, and stores, which provided many jobs for residents in the area at that time. The electric trolley services, which was built in 1894, connected the cities of Fall River and New Bedford as well as making stops at the factory and nearby Lincoln Park which was an amusement park that provided entertainment for people, especially in the summer months. Unfortunately, the village went downhill in the mid to late 20th century as the Westport Manufacturing Company went bankrupt and the closing of Lincoln Park in 1987. Today, the village has become a quiet neighborhood and is still home to many small businesses and stores along U.S. Route 6.

References 

Census-designated places in Bristol County, Massachusetts
Providence metropolitan area
Census-designated places in Massachusetts